609 Main at Texas (also referred to as Hines North Tower, Block 69) is a skyscraper in Houston, Texas. 

The 48-story skyscraper was designed by the Connecticut-based architecture firm Pickard Chilton. The building listed United Airlines as its anchor tenant, which occupied the spaces in 2018. The distinct launch feature of the building was its emphasis on sustainability: the tower received a platinum certification under the USGBC's LEED rating system, making it one of the most sustainable buildings in Houston in terms of energy efficiency and environmental impacts at the time. Notably, the tower has also featured garden rooftops as a beginning to future trend in Houston skyline.

Construction 
609 Main at Texas first came into public attention in 2011, with its estimated completion date set to be in 2013. Eventually, the construction for the building began in 2014, and was completed and opened in 2017 by the Hines Development Group.

Modern status 

The skyscraper is being actively occupied for the use between retail and office spaces. The notable tenant companies included Kirkland & Ellis LLP, White & Case, Orrick, Herrington & Sutcliffe, EnVen Energy, Royal Bank of Canada, and Hogan Lovells, among others. The 609 Main ended up as one of the 31 projects which by now have defined Houston's skyline, constructed by the Hines' group over the last 50 years.

See also
List of tallest buildings in Houston
List of tallest buildings in Texas

References

Office buildings completed in 2017
Hines Interests Limited Partnership
Buildings and structures in Houston
Skyscraper office buildings in Houston
Leadership in Energy and Environmental Design platinum certified buildings